Hackett House may refer to:

in the United States (by state)
Roy Hackett House, Tempe, Arizona, listed on the National Register of Historic Places in Maricopa County, Arizona
Edward Alexander Kelley Hackett House, Los Angeles, California, listed on the NRHP in California 
Hackett House (Napa, California), listed on the National Register of Historic Places in Napa County, California
Erwin Charles Hackett House, Oregon City, Oregon, listed on the National Register of Historic Places in Clackamas County, Oregon
Edward M. Hackett House, Reedsburg, Wisconsin, listed on the National Register of Historic Places in Sauk County, Wisconsin